William Hawley was an English footballer who played as a right-back for Huddersfield Town, Blackpool, Halifax Town, and Rotherham Town.

Career
Hawley played one game for Port Vale as a guest during World War I, playing at left-half in a 2–0 defeat to rivals Stoke on 29 March 1918. He later played for Huddersfield Town, Blackpool, Halifax Town, and Rotherham Town.

Career statistics
Source:

References

Footballers from Sheffield
English footballers
Association football fullbacks
Port Vale F.C. wartime guest players
Huddersfield Town A.F.C. players
Blackpool F.C. players
Halifax Town A.F.C. players
Rotherham Town F.C. (1899) players
English Football League players